Sklad or Tyumyati (Tumat) is a rural locality (a selo), the only inhabited locality, and the administrative center of Tumatsky Rural Okrug of Bulunsky District in the Sakha Republic, Russia, located  from Tiksi, the administrative center of the district. Its population as of the 2010 Census was 10, up from 9 recorded during the 2002 Census.

Geography
Sklad lies north of the Arctic Circle, on the left bank of the Olenyok River, upstream of its confluence with the Kelimyar. The nearest settlement is Taymylyr located further downriver.

References

Notes

Sources
Official website of the Sakha Republic. Registry of the Administrative-Territorial Divisions of the Sakha Republic. Bulunsky District. 

Rural localities in Bulunsky District
Olenyok basin